Jacqueline Mars (born October 10, 1939) is an American heiress and investor. She is the daughter of Audrey Ruth (Meyer) and Forrest Mars, Sr., and the granddaughter of Frank C. Mars, founders of the American candy company Mars, Incorporated. As of October 2022, she was ranked by Bloomberg Billionaires Index as the 22nd richest person in the world, with a net worth of US$53 billion.

Early life 
Jacqueline Mars was born on October 10, 1939. She was graduated from Miss Hall's School, located in Pittsfield, Massachusetts. Mars participated as an equestrian in many horse shows during her youth. She is a 1961 graduate of Bryn Mawr College and her degree is in anthropology.

Career 
Mars is an heiress among the members of the Mars family that founded and owns Mars Incorporated, holding shares in the company. As a member of the family, her shares of Mars, Inc. and other assets were estimated by Forbes magazine in January 2019 to be worth $23.5 billion, making her the 18th richest American, and #34 on its list of "The World's Billionaires". Mars was active in Mars, Inc. from 1982, when she joined the company as food product group president. She retired in 2001. In June 2019, Forbes listed her as the wealthiest resident living in Virginia, with an estimated 28.1 billion dollar net worth.

Personal life 
Mars married David H. Badger in 1961. They had three children: Alexandra Badger born , Stephen M. Badger born , and Christa M. Badger born . She divorced Badger in 1984. 

She married Harold 'Hank' Vogel in 1986, with whom she resided in Bedminster, New Jersey. They divorced in 1994.

Mars is a trustee of the U.S. Equestrian Team. She owns a working organic farm that is protected in perpetuity by the Land Trust of Virginia. She sits on the board of directors for both the Washington National Opera and the National Sporting Library and Fine Arts Museum. Mars also sits on the National Advisory Council of the Journey through Hallowed Ground, a foundation promoting American heritage in the region stretching from Gettysburg, Pennsylvania to Monticello, the home of Thomas Jefferson that is situated just outside Charlottesville, Virginia. 

Mars is a routine donor to the League of Conservation Voters. She received the inaugural Heritage Award granted by the Foundation for the National Archives.

2013 automobile crash 
On October 4, 2013, Mars was involved in a car crash on U.S. Route 50 in Aldie, near her home in The Plains in Northern Virginia. Her vehicle crossed the highway center line and struck a Chrysler minivan carrying six passengers. One person died at the scene and another, who was pregnant, subsequently miscarried.  Mars was charged with reckless driving. She told a witness after the crash that she had fallen asleep at the wheel. Mars subsequently pleaded guilty to the misdemeanor charge of reckless driving, with tests having revealed no drugs, alcohol, or medications in her system that could have caused a blackout (test was given 72 hours after accident).

References 

Living people
American billionaires
Businesspeople in confectionery
Female billionaires
Mars family
Bryn Mawr College alumni
1939 births
Businesspeople from Virginia
People from Bedminster, New Jersey
People from The Plains, Virginia